Robert Arthur 'Bobby' Hancock (22 June 1922 – 9 February 1973) was an Australian rules footballer who played with St Kilda in the VFL during the late 1940s.  A small rover, Hancock served in the Navy before arriving at St Kilda in 1946. He won St Kilda's best and fairest award in 1948 and represented Victoria in 3 interstate matches that year. Hancock also finished equal 6th in the 1948 Brownlow Medal count.

References

External links

Trevor Barker Award winners
Australian rules footballers from Victoria (Australia)
St Kilda Football Club players
1922 births
1973 deaths